The Natural II is the ninth studio album by rapper Haystak. It was released on May 12, 2009. The album peaked on the Billboard 200 R&B/Hip-Hop Albums at 47, 42 on the Independent Albums, and 20 on the Rap Albums.

 Times Is Tight
 Old Money
 Goons Involved
 Listen Up
 S.T.A.K
 Throwed Off
 Mash On A Small Timer
 I'm So Blessed
 My Mistress
 Why We Gotta Live Like This
 It's Ok
 Don't Care
 Fallin Warriors
 In These Streets

References 

2009 albums
Haystak albums
Real Talk Entertainment albums
Sequel albums
Albums produced by Big Hollis